Phebalium lepidotum is a species of rounded shrub that is endemic to Western Australia. It has scaly branchlets, leathery, narrow oblong leaves and white to cream-coloured flowers arranged in umbels of between three and six on the ends of branchlets.

Description
Its branchlets are slightly glandular-warty and covered with scales. Flowering occurs from August to November.

Taxonomy
This species was first formally described in 1863 by Nikolai Turczaninow and given the name Boronia lepidota in the journal Bulletin de la Société Impériale des Naturalistes de Moscou, from specimens collected by James Drummond. In 1970, Paul G. Wilson changed the name to Phebalium lepidotum, publishing the change in the journal Nuytsia.

Distribution
Phebalium lepidotum is found between Merredin, Zanthus and the south coast of Western Australia.

Conservation status
This phebalium is classified as "not threatened" by the Government of Western Australia Department of Parks and Wildlife.

References

lepidotum
Flora of Western Australia
Plants described in 1863
Taxa named by Nikolai Turczaninow
Taxa named by Paul G. Wilson